Virginia Vestoff (December 9, 1939 – May 2, 1982) was an American actress of film, television and Broadway.

Early life
Vestoff was born into a family of vaudeville performers in New York City. Both her Russian immigrant father and mother, who was the great niece of American composer Stephen Foster, died and left Virginia an orphan at the age of nine. She coped with the loss by acting, and took third prize on The Ted Mack Amateur Hour, which launched a professional career with the Children's Chorus of the New York City Opera.

While living with relatives, Virginia attended the New York High School for the Performing Arts. At 15, she decided to move out and manage life on her own by attending Washington Irving High School and moonlighting as a salesgirl at a department store. However, Virginia quit school early to tour with a dance company. The failure to graduate remained a personal regret to Virginia throughout her life, which she countered with a thirst to self-educate, becoming an extensive reader.

Professional career
Soon after dropping out, Vestoff landed a part on stage in The Boy Friend and it led to many of her other theatrical credits including I'm Getting My Act Together and Taking It On the Road, Spokesong, Drinks Before Dinner, The Misanthrope, Love and Let Love, Man With a Load of Mischief, Ben Bagley's New Cole Porter Revue, And in this Corner, A Doll's House, Fallout, The Crystal Heart, Private Lives, The Threepenny Opera, The Archbishop's Ceiling, Booth is Back in Town, Camelot, Put it in Writing, The King and I, and My Fair Lady.

Vestoff made her Broadway debut in the 1960 revue From A to Z. Her most famous stage role was that of Abigail Adams in 1776, a role which garnered her a Tony nomination and one she reprised in the film adaptation. Additional Broadway credits include Irma La Douce, Boccaccio, Via Galactica, and Baker Street, in which she met her future husband, writer Morty Lefkoe, president and founder of the Lefkoe Institute and creator of the Lefkoe Method, a psychological process.
 
For a time, Vestoff took on dual duties with Broadway and daytime drama. From October 20, 1969 to June 20, 1970, she played Dr. Althea Davis on The Doctors, taking over from a departing Elizabeth Hubbard. When Vestoff left due to her unhappiness with the role, (eventually joining the cast of Dark Shadows as Samantha Collins), Hubbard returned to the role on October 1, 1970.

Vestoff also did another soap opera stint on As the World Turns and appeared in numerous television commercials, including Sure Deodorant, Geritol, Hamburger Helper, Sardo Bath Beads, and Bradlees.

Vestoff's primetime television guest credits included The Quinns, Carmody, Contact: The Case of the Secret Message, We Interrupt This Season, Alone at Last and Kojak. Her screen roles included Robert Altman's A Wedding and Such Good Friends.

Vestoff succumbed to cancer in New York City at age 42.

Filmography

References

External links
 
 
 
 

1939 births
1982 deaths
American film actresses
American people of Russian descent
American musical theatre actresses
American television actresses
Deaths from cancer in New York (state)
20th-century American actresses
20th-century American singers
Washington Irving High School (New York City) alumni
20th-century American women singers